The 1941 National Division was the 5th edition of the Turkish National Division. Beşiktaş won their first title.

Participants
Eskişehir Demirspor - Eskişehir Football League and 1940 Turkish Football Championship winners
Beşiktaş - Istanbul Football League, 1st
Fenerbahçe - Istanbul Football League, 2nd
Galatasaray - Istanbul Football League, 3rd
İstanbulspor - Istanbul Football League, 4th
Gençlerbirliği - Ankara Football League, 1st
Harp Okulu - Ankara Football League, 2nd
Maskespor - Ankara Football League, 3rd
Altay - İzmir Football League, 1st
Altınordu - İzmir Football League, 2nd

League standings

Results

References
 Erdoğan Arıpınar; Tevfik Ünsi Artun, Cem Atabeyoğlu, Nurhan Aydın, Ergun Hiçyılmaz, Haluk San, Orhan Vedat Sevinçli, Vala Somalı (June 1992). Türk Futbol Tarihi (1904-1991) vol.1, Page(82), Türkiye Futbol Federasyonu Yayınları.

Turkish National Division Championship seasons
1940–41 in Turkish football
Turkey